Alanoud Ihab Moh Ghazi Al-Zabrey (born 18 May 1999), also known as Alanoud Ihab, is an Iraqi-born Jordanian footballer who plays as a defender for the Jordan women's national team.

References

External links

1999 births
Living people
Jordanian women's footballers
Jordan women's international footballers
Women's association football defenders
Iraqi sportswomen
Sportspeople from Baghdad
Jordan Women's Football League players